Reach for the Stars may refer to:

 "Reach for the Stars", a Cash Cash song for the Sega video game Sonic Colors
 "Reach for the Stars" (will.i.am song), 2012
 "Reach for the Stars" (Shirley Bassey song), 1961
 "Reach for the Stars" (Richard Harvey song), 1984
 "Reach" (S Club 7 song), commonly referred to as "Reach for the Stars"
 Reach for the Stars (CBS promo), a 1981 CBS space-themed campaign
 Reach for the Stars (Indian TV series), an Indian English-dubbed TV series
 Reach for the Stars (video game), a 1983 science fiction strategy video game
 Reach for the Stars (game show), a 1967 American game show